Diane Cook (born 1954) is an American photographer.

Cook has frequently collaborated with her partner Len Jenshel. In 2017 they released the co-authored photo book Wise Trees.

Her work is included in collection of the Museum of Fine Arts Houston, and the Los Angeles County Museum of Art.

References

Living people
1954 births
20th-century American photographers
21st-century American photographers
20th-century American women artists
21st-century American women